Kristian Sørum is a Norwegian curler and World Champion. He was skip for the winning team at the 1979 World Curling Championships, the rest of the team consisting of Morten Sørum, Eigil Ramsfjell and Gunnar Meland.

References

Living people
Norwegian male curlers
World curling champions
Year of birth missing (living people)
20th-century Norwegian people